"Hotel Room Service" is a song by American rapper Pitbull released as the third single from his fourth album, Pitbull Starring in Rebelution. It was released to both iTunes and mainstream radio on June 16, 2009. The song peaked at number eight on the US Billboard Hot 100, making it his second top 10 hit following "I Know You Want Me (Calle Ocho)".

The song samples "Push the Feeling On" by Nightcrawlers and interpolates lyrics from Jay-Z's "I Just Wanna Love U" ("Gimme that sweet, that nasty, that gushy stuff"), The Notorious B.I.G.'s "Nasty Girl" ("Put them fingers in your mouth / Open up your blouse / Pull that g-string down south"), and Sugarhill Gang's "Rapper's Delight" ("We at the hotel, motel, Holiday Inn"). It also references "Whatever You Like" by T.I. when it says "And like T.I.'s 'Whatever You Like'".

On September 16, the official remix to "Hotel Room Service" was released, which features Pussycat Dolls lead singer Nicole Scherzinger.

Music video
The song's official music video was released on August 10, 2009 to Pitbull's YouTube channel.

Jim Jonsin, Sophia Del Carmen and Feisty from For the Love of Ray J make cameo appearances in the video as does Nayer and Sagia Castañeda, who appeared in the "I Know You Want Me (Calle Ocho)" video as well. The video features Pitbull with models Elizabeth Mendez, Cassie Codi, Lisa Morales, Anya Gonzalez, and Kimbella Vanderhee.

A version of the song titled "Super Clean Edit" (3:58) was released to radio stations and features alternate lyrics in place of the 'egg whites' line.
undone:
Yo' man just left, I'm the doctor tonight. Check up right! Oh, you the healthy type, well I'mma give you just what you like...
This version also replaces the outro in which Pitbull exclaims 'Mujeres!' to an English translation 'All my women!'

The video was also released onto Pitbull's official VEVO channel on November 14, that year. It has received almost 300 million views.

Critical reception
The song received generally favorable reviews, with David Jeffries from AllMusic saying, "nothing ... could fill a dancefloor as quickly as the ... stunner ... 'Hotel Room Service', which triple mashes an old-school hit ('Rapper's Delight'), a 2 Live Crew classic ('One and One'), plus a house music giant (the Nightcrawlers' 'Push the Feeling On')."

Track listing
"Hotel Room Service"  – 3:58
"Hotel Room Service (Remix)" (featuring Nicole Scherzinger) – 3:47

Charts

Weekly charts

Remix version

Year-end charts

Certifications

References

2009 songs
2009 singles
Songs about hotels and motels
Pitbull (rapper) songs
Song recordings produced by Jim Jonsin
Songs written by Nile Rodgers
Songs written by Pitbull (rapper)
Songs written by Bernard Edwards
Hip house songs